Wyllow was a Cornish hermit saint and martyr whose existence was reported by William Worcester.

He was said to have been born in Ireland but worked in Cornwall.

He was reputedly beheaded by Melyn ys Kynrede ("Melyn's kinfolk") in the parish of Lanteglos, near Fowey.  Supposedly, he then carried his head for half a mile to St Willow's Bridge, where a church was later built in his honour. Nicholas Roscarrock gives his feast day as 3 June.
He is still commemorated in Cornwall, with the 15th century St. Wyllow's Church.  built by Thomas Mohun at Lanteglos-by-Fowey.

He is also known as Vylloc and his dates of birth and death are unknown, though it is likely that he lived in the 6th century. St. Willow is regarded as the patron of Lanteglos.

See also 
Mybbard and Mancus

References

6th-century Christian martyrs
6th-century executions
Executed Irish people
Medieval Irish saints of Cornwall
Cephalophores
6th-century Irish people
Medieval Cornish saints
Irish expatriates in England
Irish people executed abroad
Executed Cornish people
Year of birth unknown
Year of death unknown
English hermits